Antidepressant discontinuation syndrome, also called antidepressant withdrawal syndrome, is a condition that can occur following the interruption, reduction, or discontinuation of antidepressant medication following its continuous use of at least a month. The symptoms may include flu-like symptoms, trouble sleeping, nausea, poor balance, sensory changes, anxiety, and depression. The problem usually begins within three days and may last for several months or years. Rarely psychosis may occur.

A discontinuation syndrome can occur after stopping any antidepressant including selective serotonin reuptake inhibitors (SSRIs), serotonin–norepinephrine reuptake inhibitors (SNRIs), monoamine oxidase inhibitors (MAOIs) and tricyclic antidepressants (TCAs). The risk is greater among those who have taken the medication for longer and when the medication in question has a short half-life. The underlying reason for its occurrence is unclear. The diagnosis is based on the symptoms.

Methods of prevention include gradually decreasing the dose among those who wish to stop, though it is possible for symptoms to occur with tapering. Treatment may include restarting the medication and slowly decreasing the dose. People may also be switched to the long acting antidepressant fluoxetine which can then be gradually decreased.

Approximately 20–50% of people who suddenly stop an antidepressant develop an antidepressant discontinuation syndrome. The condition is generally not serious, though about half of people with symptoms describe them as severe. Many restart antidepressants due to the severity of the symptoms.

Signs and symptoms 
People with antidepressant discontinuation syndrome have been on an antidepressant for at least four weeks and have recently stopped taking the medication, whether abruptly, after a fast taper, or each time the medication is reduced on a slow taper. Commonly reported symptoms include flu-like symptoms (nausea, vomiting, diarrhea, headaches, sweating) and sleep disturbances (insomnia, nightmares, constant sleepiness). Sensory and movement disturbances have also been reported, including imbalance, tremors, vertigo, dizziness, and electric-shock-like experiences in the brain, often described by people who have them as "brain zaps". These "brain zaps" have been described as an electric shock felt in the skull, potentially triggered by lateral eye movement, and at times accompanied by vertigo, pain, or dissociative symptoms. Some individuals consider it as a pleasant experience akin to an orgasm, however it is more often reported as an unpleasant experience that interferes with daily function. Mood disturbances such as dysphoria, anxiety, or agitation are also reported, as are cognitive disturbances such as confusion and hyperarousal. 
In cases associated with sudden discontinuation of MAO inhibitors, acute psychosis has been observed.  Over fifty symptoms have been reported.

A 2009 Advisory Committee to the FDA found that online anecdotal reports of discontinuation syndrome related to duloxetine included severe symptoms and exceeded prevalence of both paroxetine and venlafaxine reports by over 250% (although acknowledged this may have been influenced by duloxetine being a much newer drug). It also found that the safety information provided by the manufacturer not only neglected important information about managing discontinuation syndrome, but also explicitly advised against opening capsules, a practice required to gradually taper dosage.

Duration

Most cases of discontinuation syndrome may last between one and four weeks and resolve on their own. Occasionally symptoms can last up to one year. They typically resolve within a day of restoring the medication. Paroxetine and venlafaxine seem to be particularly difficult to discontinue, and prolonged withdrawal syndrome (post-acute-withdrawal syndrome, or PAWS) lasting over 18 months has been reported with paroxetine.

Mechanism

The underlying reason for its occurrence is unclear, though the syndrome appears similar to withdrawal from other psychotropic drugs such as benzodiazepines.

Prevention and treatment 
In some cases, withdrawal symptoms may be prevented by taking medication as directed, and when discontinuing, doing so gradually, although symptoms may appear while tapering. When discontinuing an antidepressant with a short half-life, switching to a drug with a longer half-life (e.g. fluoxetine or citalopram) and then tapering, and eventually discontinuing, from that drug can decrease the severity of symptoms in some cases.

Treatment is dependent on the severity of the discontinuation reaction and whether or not further antidepressant treatment is warranted. In cases where further antidepressant treatment is prescribed, then the only option suggested may be restarting the antidepressant. If antidepressants are no longer required, treatment depends on symptom severity. If symptoms of discontinuation are severe, or do not respond to symptom management, the antidepressant can be reinstated and then withdrawn more cautiously, or by switching to a drug with a longer half life, (such as fluoxetine), and then tapering and discontinuing that drug. In severe cases, hospitalization may be required.

Pregnancy and newborns 
Antidepressants, including SSRIs, can cross the placenta and have the potential to affect the fetus and newborn, including an increased chance of miscarriage, presenting a dilemma for pregnant women to decide whether to continue to take antidepressants at all, or if they do, considering if tapering and discontinuing during pregnancy could have a protective effect for the newborn.

Postnatal adaptation syndrome (PNAS) (originally called "neonatal behavioral syndrome", "poor neonatal adaptation syndrome", or "neonatal withdrawal syndrome") was first noticed in 1973 in newborns of mothers taking antidepressants; symptoms in the infant include irritability, rapid breathing, hypothermia, and blood sugar problems. The symptoms usually develop from birth to days after delivery and usually resolve within days or weeks of delivery.

Culture and history 

Antidepressant discontinuation symptoms were first reported with imipramine, the first tricyclic antidepressant (TCA), in the late 1950s, and each new class of antidepressants has brought reports of similar conditions, including monoamine oxidase inhibitors (MAOIs), SSRIs, and SNRIs.  As of 2001, at least 21 different antidepressants, covering all the major classes, were known to cause discontinuation syndromes. The problem has been poorly studied, and most of the literature has been case reports or small clinical studies; incidence is hard to determine and controversial.

With the explosion of use and interest in SSRIs in the late 1980s and early 1990s, focused especially on Prozac, interest grew as well in discontinuation syndromes. Some of the symptoms emerged from discussion boards where people with depression discussed their experiences with the disease and their medications; "brain zaps" or "brain shivers" was one symptom that emerged via these websites.

Heightened media attention and continuing public concerns led to the formation of an expert group on the safety of selective serotonin reuptake inhibitors in England, to evaluate all the research available prior to 2004. The group determined that the incidence of discontinuation symptoms are between 5% and 49%, depending on the particular SSRI, the length of time on the medicine and abrupt versus gradual cessation.

With the lack of a definition based on consensus criteria for the syndrome, a panel met in Phoenix, Arizona, in 1997 to form a draft definition, which other groups continued to refine.

In the late 1990s, some investigators thought that the fact that symptoms emerged when antidepressants were discontinued might mean that antidepressants were causing addiction, and some used the term "withdrawal syndrome" to describe the symptoms. While people taking antidepressants do not commonly exhibit drug-seeking behavior, stopping antidepressants leads to  similar symptoms as found in drug withdrawal from benzodiazapines, and other psychotropic drugs. As such, some researchers advocate the term withdrawal over discontinuation, to communicate the similar physiological dependence and negative outcomes. Due to pressure from pharmaceutical companies who make anti-depressants, the term "withdrawal syndrome" is no longer used by drug makers, and thus, most doctors, due to concerns that they may be compared to other drugs more commonly associated with withdrawal.

2013 class action lawsuit 

In 2013, a proposed class action lawsuit, Jennifer L Saavedra v. Eli Lilly and Company, was brought against Eli Lilly claiming that the Cymbalta label omitted important information about "brain zaps" and other symptoms upon cessation. Eli Lilly moved for dismissal per the "learned intermediary doctrine" as the doctors prescribing the drug were warned of the potential problems and are an intermediary medical judgment between Lilly and patients; in December 2013, Lilly's motion to dismiss was denied.

Research 
The mechanisms of antidepressant withdrawal syndrome have not yet been conclusively identified.  The leading hypothesis is that after the antidepressant is discontinued, there is a temporary, but in some cases, long-lasting, deficiency in the brain of one or more essential neurotransmitters that regulate mood, such as serotonin, dopamine, norepinephrine, and gamma-aminobutyric acid, and since neurotransmitters are an interrelated system, dysregulation of one affects the others.

See also 

 Benzodiazepine withdrawal syndrome
 Post-ssri sexual dysfunction (PSSD)

References

External links 

Antidepressants
Syndromes
Withdrawal syndromes
Wikipedia medicine articles ready to translate